Jamaica competed at the 2000 Summer Olympics in Sydney, Australia.

Medalists

Athletics

Men
Track and road events
{|class=wikitable style=font-size:90%;text-align:center
|-
!rowspan=2|Athlete
!rowspan=2|Event
!colspan=2|Heat
!colspan=2|Quarterfinal
!colspan=2|Semifinal
!colspan=2|Final
|-style=font-size:95%
!Time
!Rank
!Time
!Rank
!Time
!Rank
!Time
!Rank
|-
|align=left|Christopher Williams
|align=left rowspan=3|100 m
|10.35
|1 Q
|10.30
|4
|colspan=4 
|-
|align=left|Patrick Jarrett
|10.41
|3 Q
|16.4
|8
|colspan=4 
|-
|align=left|Lindel Frater
|10.45
|3 Q
|10.23
|4 q
|10.46
|8
|colspan=2 
|-
|align=left|Christopher Williams
|align=left rowspan=3|200 m
|20.45
|1 Q
|20.25
|2 Q
|20.47
|5
|colspan=2 
|-
|align=left|Dwight Thomas
|20.85
|2 Q
|20.58
|5
|colspan=4 
|-
|align=left|Ricardo Williams
|21.09
|5
|colspan=6 
|-
|align=left|Danny McFarlane
|align=left rowspan=3|400 m
|45.84
|2 Q
|45.40
|4 Q
|44.93
|2 Q
|44.70
|7
|-
|align=left|Gregory Haughton
|45.63
|1 Q
|45.08
|2 Q
|44.93
|3 Q
|44.70
|
|-
|align=left|Davian Clarke
|45.30
|2 Q
|45.06
|1 Q
|colspan=2|Did not finish
|colspan=2 
|-
|align=left|Marvin Watts
|align=left|800 m
|1:59.97
|8 |colspan=2 
|1:47.6
|8
|colspan=2 
|-
|align=left|Robert Foster
|align=left|110 m hurdles
| 14.33
| 7
|colspan=6 
|-
|align=left|Dinsdale Morgan
|align=left rowspan=3|400 m hurdles
|49.64
|2 Q|align=left rowspan=3 colspan=2 
|50.23
|7
|colspan=2 
|-
|align=left|Kemel Thompson
|50.40
|4
|colspan=4 
|-
|align=left|Ian Weakley
|52.18
|8
|colspan=4 
|-
|align=left| Llewelyn BredwoodLindel FraterDonovan Powell*Dwight ThomasChristopher Williams
|align=left| relay
|38.97
|4 Q|colspan=2 
|38.27
|2 Q|38.20
|4
|-
|align=left|Sanjay AyreMichael BlackwoodGregory HaughtonMichael McDonald*Danny McFarlaneChristopher Williams*|align=left| relay
|3:03.85
|1 Q|colspan=2 
|2:58.84
|2 Q'|2:58.78
|
|}

Field events

Combined events – Decathlon

Women
Track and road events

Field events

Sailing

Swimming

Women

Qualifiers for the latter rounds (Q) of all events were decided on a time only basis, therefore positions shown are overall results versus competitors in all heats.
* – Indicates athlete swam in the preliminaries but not in the final race.

Triathlon

See also
Jamaica at the 1999 Pan American Games

References

Wallechinsky, David (2004). The Complete Book of the Summer Olympics (Athens 2004 Edition)''. Toronto, Canada. .
International Olympic Committee (2001). The Results. Retrieved 12 November 2005.
Sydney Organising Committee for the Olympic Games (2001). Official Report of the XXVII Olympiad Volume 1: Preparing for the Games. Retrieved 20 November 2005.
Sydney Organising Committee for the Olympic Games (2001). Official Report of the XXVII Olympiad Volume 2: Celebrating the Games. Retrieved 20 November 2005.
Sydney Organising Committee for the Olympic Games (2001). The Results. Retrieved 20 November 2005.
International Olympic Committee Web Site
sports-reference

Nations at the 2000 Summer Olympics
2000 Summer Olympics
Summer Olympics